is a Japanese footballer currently playing as a forward for FC Imabari.

Career statistics

Club
.

Notes

References

2003 births
Living people
People from Imabari, Ehime
Association football people from Ehime Prefecture
Japanese footballers
Association football forwards
J3 League players
FC Imabari players